Teliyargunj is a township of Allahabad, Uttar Pradesh, India. Motilal Nehru National Institute of Technology Allahabad, a prominent engineering college, and Northern Regional Institute of Printing Technology are two institutes of higher education located in the township. The old Cantonment of Allahabad is located near this area. The Ganges river flows adjacent to this locality. Allahabad-Lucknow Road passes through Teliyargunj.

In 2017, Ranjan Kumar Prajapati (Congress) was elected in the Allahabad Nagar Nigam Elections.

References 

Neighbourhoods in Allahabad